Theodore Brenson (1893–1959) was a Latvian-American abstract artist and educator.

Biography 
Brenson was born in Riga, Latvia in 1903. He attended the Art School of the City of Riga, the Imperial Academy of Beaux-Arts in St. Petersburg, Russia, University of Moscow, and the University of Riga.

Brenson emigrated to the United States where he taught at the College of Wooster in Wooster, Ohio, the Cummington School of the Arts in Cummington, Massachusetts, Manhattan College, and Douglass College where he was chair of the Art Department.

In 1957 he received the Prix de la Critique in Paris, becoming the first American abstract artist to receive that honor. He was also associated with the Atelier 17 printmaking studio.

Brenson died of a heart attack on September 21, 1959 while working at the MacDowell Colony in Peterborough, New Hampshire.

Brenson's work is included in the collections of the Brooklyn Museum, the  Detroit Institute of Arts, the National Gallery of Art, and the Whitney Museum of American Art. His papers are in the Archives of American Art at the  Smithsonian Institution.

References 

Year of birth uncertain
1959 deaths
20th-century American artists
Atelier 17 alumni
Immigrants to the United States